A Tale of Two Sisters is a 2013 South Korean television daily drama starring Park Se-young, Lee Hae-in, Yoo Gun, and Park Jae-jung. It aired on KBS1 from April 29 to November 1, 2013, airing every Monday to Friday at 20:25 for 135 episodes.

Plot
Choi Se-young works part-time for a broadcasting company, and dreams of becoming an announcer. She was adopted when she was a young child. After she reunites with her birth mother, she becomes torn between her adoptive family and biological family. She goes through hardships between Yerin, but still forgives her.

Cast

Main characters
Park Se-young as Choi Se-young / Lee Yeon-joo (27)
Lee Hae-in as Lee Ye-rin / Kim Shin-hye (27)
Yoo Gun as Han Jae-sung (30)
Park Jae-jung as Ahn Jung-hyo (30)

Supporting characters
Choi Se-young's family
Jung Hye-sun as Shim Ae-gi (80)
Lee Ki-young as Choi Jin-sa (60)
Im Ji-eun as Choi Il-young (39)
Kim Chae-yeon as Choi Yi-young (35)
Lee Do-yeon as Noh Ji-hyun (9)

Lee Ye-rin's family
Shim Hye-jin as Kim Joo-hee (54)
Lee Jung-ho as Lee Min-gook (32)
Oh Seung-eun as Oh Young-ah (30)

Han Jae-sung's family
Jeon Moo-song as Han Ki-seok
Kil Yong-woo as Han Yong-deok (57)
Yang Geum-seok as Lee Mi-sook (54)
Lee Se-chang as Lee Sung-soo (43)
Ha Yeon-joo as Han Ki-eun

Extended cast
Hong Jin-hee as Jang Mi-hwa (50)
Lim Yoon-ho as Jang Dong-wook (25)
Choi Su-rin as Sarah Kim	
Lee Jung-hoon as Seo Dong-won (40)
Im Hyuk-pil as Kye Goo-man (40)
Yoon Chae-yi as Han Seol-hee (33)
Im Soo-hyun as Kim Na-ri (27)

Awards and nominations

References

External links
  
 
 

Korean Broadcasting System television dramas
2013 South Korean television series debuts
2013 South Korean television series endings
Korean-language television shows
South Korean romance television series